Ainapur is a village in the southern state of Karnataka, India. Administratively, Ainapur is under  the Yaktapur gram panchayat, Shorapur Taluka of Yadgir District in Karnataka.

Demographics
 census, Ainapur had 493 inhabitants, with 245 males and 248 females.

See also
 Yadgir

References

External links
 

Villages in Yadgir district